Kameleon 2 is a 2005 Dutch family film with main characters identical twins  
Hielke Klinkhamer (Koen van der Donk) and Sietse Klinkhamer (Jos van der Donk), also identical twins, born 6 March 1988. It follows the twins as they try to raise money for their sick friend Marieke.

It is a sequel of De Schippers van de Kameleon, with these same characters and actors. In 2021, it was followed by sequel De Kameleon aan de ketting.

References

External links

2005 films
2000s Dutch-language films
Dutch action films
Dutch adventure films
Films based on Dutch novels
Seafaring films
Dutch children's films
2000s action adventure films